Mehr Azin (also Romanized as Mehr Āz̄īn) is a village in Malard Rural District, in the Central District of Malard County, Tehran Province, Iran. At the 2006 census, its population was 1,189, in 296 families.

References 

Populated places in Malard County